Lyco and Orphe are two sisters from Greek mythology. Their story survives in the works of Maurus Servius Honoratus, a Latin grammarian of the early fifth century AD.

Family 
They were the daughters of Amphithea and Dion, the queen and king of Laconia. They had a third sister named Carya.

Mythology 
Once Apollo, the god of prophecy, paid a visit to Dion and his family. He was so well-received that he gave all three of Dion's daughters the gift of prophecy, under the condition that they would never betray the gods or seek after forbidden things. Later, Dionysus visited the family and fell in love with Carya, so that he visited again in order to see her. But Lyco and Orphe guarded Carya, and tried to prevent Dionysus from wooing her. Dionysus then reminded them of their promise to Apollo, and drove them mad. As the two sisters reached the top of Mount Taygetus in their raging madness, they were transformed into rocks.

See also 
 Psalacantha
 Metamorphoses in Greek mythology

References

Bibliography 
 Maurus Servius Honoratus, In Vergilii carmina comentarii. Servii Grammatici qui feruntur in Vergilii carmina commentarii; recensuerunt Georgius Thilo et Hermannus Hagen. Georgius Thilo. Leipzig. B. G. Teubner. 1881. Online version available at perseus.tufts.
 

Metamorphoses into inanimate objects in Greek mythology
Dionysus in mythology
Laconian mythology
Classical oracles
Mythological Greek seers
Princesses in Greek mythology
Deeds of Apollo
el:Λυκώ